Boulton & Co was a British news programme airing between 1pm and 2pm on weekdays on Sky News.

It was presented by the channel's political editor, Adam Boulton who gave up his Sunday morning show to take on the weekday commitment, and Sarah Hewson, Sky's former Royal correspondent. Sarah-Jane Mee and Jayne Secker acted as relief second presenter.

Unlike other programmes on Sky News which are broadcast from their main studios, Boulton & Co came from Sky's Westminster studio. The programme featured interviews, breaking news stories and hard hitting debates. Although its focus was primarily on UK events, the show was aired internationally. It was launched on Monday 17 January 2011.

The show ended on Friday 1 August 2014 with Adam Boulton and Sarah Hewson moving to host a new evening show, Sky News Tonight, from September 2014.

References 

2011 British television series debuts
2014 British television series endings
Sky News
Sky UK original programming
Sky television news shows